Crystal Lake, the largest lake of this name in Michigan, is located near Lake Michigan in Benzie County about  southwest of Traverse City and about  northeast of Frankfort at . At , it is Michigan's ninth largest inland lake. Up to and through the American Civil War years Crystal Lake was known as "Cap Lake" due to the frequent whitecaps visible on its surface. Crystal Lake is adjacent to the southern reaches of the Sleeping Bear Dunes National Lakeshore.

In 1873, an effort was made to connect Crystal Lake with Lake Michigan via a channel. Although the project was a failure, the lowering of the lake level uncovered sandy beaches, including the current public beach at Beulah.

The watershed that feeds Crystal Lake is very small, and fertilizer and sewage outflows are minimal, leading to the exceptionally clear and beautiful water that gives it its current name. The surface area of the lake is 35% of the total area of the drainage basin (land and water combined).

See also
List of lakes in Michigan

References

External links
 
Crystal Lake Michigan Gems: Flickr Photo Group

Lakes of Michigan
Bodies of water of Benzie County, Michigan